Liquid Assets Paint & Pigment Company is an artist supply company based in Buenos Aires, Argentina that manufactures acrylic paints and pigments created with real currency, such as Euro, US Dollar, Argentine Peso, and Romanian Leu. The Company's slogan "The Price of Art" refers to the company's assertion that its products allow fine artists to quantify the precise and actual value of a work of art created using Liquid Assets products. The company was started in 2007 by a group of Buenos Aires-based professional artists and presently operates a manufacturing plant in Buenos Aires, as well as a retail store in the Palermo Soho neighborhood. In September 2010, Liquid Assets opened a temporary pop up store in New York City's Tribeca neighborhood in conjunction with the Swervewolf Experience marketing and design firm. Although artists have used valuable commodities such as gold leaf to create works of art for centuries, such as gilding, Liquid Assets Paint & Pigment Company is the world's only known manufacturer of artist paint and pigment created with actual currency.

References

External links
Official site

Art materials brands